Lithuania officially has competed at the IAAF World Championships since 1993.

Medals table

IAAF World Championships in Athletics

IAAF World Indoor Championships in Athletics

IAAF World Cup in Athletics

IAAF World Junior Championships in Athletics
Medals:

IAAF World Youth Championships in Athletics
Medals:

IAAF World Half Marathon Championships
Živilė Balčiūnaitė set best Lithuania's performance in IAAF World Half Marathon Championships by reaching 17th place.

See also
Lithuania at the Olympics

References

Athletics in Lithuania
Nations at the World Athletics Championships